Schivenoglia is a comune (municipality) in the Province of Mantua in the Italian region Lombardy, located about  southeast of Milan and about  southeast of Mantua.

Schivenoglia borders the following municipalities: Borgo Mantovano, Quingentole, Quistello, San Giovanni del Dosso.

References

Cities and towns in Lombardy